Waldemar Woźniak (18 September 1954 – 18 May 2003) was a Polish gymnast. He competed in seven events at the 1980 Summer Olympics.

References

1954 births
2003 deaths
Polish male artistic gymnasts
Olympic gymnasts of Poland
Gymnasts at the 1980 Summer Olympics
Gymnasts from Warsaw